Kylie Wheeler (born 17 January 1980 in Subiaco) is an Australian retired heptathlete.

Wheeler is a six-times Australia national champion in heptathlon in 2003, 2004, 2005, 2006, 2007 and 2008. Wheeler also won a silver medal in the Athletics at the 2002 Commonwealth Games and 2006 Commonwealth Games and won the event also at the 2003 Summer Universiade.

She announced her retirement from the sport in order to follow other commitments and interests outside athletics in May 2009.
She is now Head Athletics Coach at Guildford Grammar.

References

External links 

1980 births
Living people
Australian heptathletes
Athletes (track and field) at the 2002 Commonwealth Games
Athletes (track and field) at the 2004 Summer Olympics
Athletes (track and field) at the 2008 Summer Olympics
Olympic athletes of Australia
Commonwealth Games silver medallists for Australia
Sportswomen from Western Australia
Commonwealth Games medallists in athletics
Universiade medalists in athletics (track and field)
Universiade gold medalists for Australia
People educated at St Mary's Anglican Girls' School
Medalists at the 2003 Summer Universiade
Medallists at the 2002 Commonwealth Games